Bitnja Vas (in older sources also Bitna Vas) is a small village in the Municipality of Mokronog-Trebelno in southeastern Slovenia. The area is part of the historical region of Lower Carniola and is now included in the Southeast Slovenia Statistical Region.

Name
Bitnja Vas was attested in written sources as Wittendorf in 1409, Bittendorf in 1425, and Bitinoues in 1474, among other spellings.

References

External links
Bitnja Vas on Geopedia

Populated places in the Municipality of Mokronog-Trebelno